Dabarkot, or Dabar Kot, is a tell site of the Indus Civilization in Balochistan, Pakistan. The large city was once a trading post dating back to fifth millennium BC. Various artifacts and figurines excavated from the area show a Harappan connection of the site. The Dabarkot mound is 500 yards in diameter showing the settlement was large in size and of considerable significance. Excavations from the site recovered various artifacts including stone beads, copper pieces, a gold pin, sheet metal, and large mud bricks.

It is believed that after the Indus Civilization, the mound was destroyed and inhabited by other cultures.

The present day site is located in the Loralai District of Balochistan and is under the federal protection under the Antiquities Act 1975.

References

Archaeological sites in Balochistan, Pakistan
Indus Valley civilisation sites
Loralai District